Korean Cultural Centers (Korean: 한국문화원, Hanja: 韓國文化院) are non-profit institutions aligned with the Government of South Korea that aim to promote Korean culture and facilitate cultural exchanges.

History 
Starting from 2009, the Korean Culture and Information Service began setting up Korean Cultural Centers around the world.

Overview 
The centers are run by the Korean Culture and Information Service, a subdivision of South Korea's Ministry of Culture, Sports and Tourism.

Initiatives 
As part of efforts to introduce and spread interest in diverse aspects of Korean culture, the centers have organized many programs under the categories of arts, music, literature, film and cuisine.

List of Korean Cultural Centers 

As of 2021, there are 33 Korean Cultural Centers in 28 countries.

Asia-Pacific 
  - Sydney
  - Beijing and Shanghai
  - Hong Kong
  - New Delhi
  - Jakarta
  - Tokyo and Osaka
  - Astana
  - Taguig
  - Bangkok
  - Hanoi

Europe 
  - Brussels
  - Paris
  - Berlin
  - Budapest
  - Rome
  - Warsaw
  - Moscow
  - Madrid 
  - London

The Americas 
  - Buenos Aires
  - São Paulo
  - Ottawa
  - Mexico City 
  - Washington D.C., Los Angeles and New York City

Middle East and Africa 
  - Cairo
  - Abuja
  - Pretoria
  - Ankara
  - Abu Dhabi

See also 
 Culture of Korea
 Korean Wave
 Korea Foundation
 King Sejong Institute

References

External links
Korean Cultural Centers

Organizations established in 2009
Foreign relations of South Korea
Cultural promotion organizations
Korean culture
Korean language